Cariad could refer to:
 Cariad@iaith:love4language, a Welsh television series
 Cariad Cywir, a Welsh folk-song
 Cariad Lake, a lake in Canada
 Cariad Lloyd, a British performer
 CARIAD, a software subsidiary of Volkswagen Group